Boys From The Bush is a British television series produced by the BBC. It was created and written by Douglas Livingstone. Two series, each of ten 50-minute episodes, were made between 1991 and 1992. Although never achieving mainstream success, the series has since gathered a dedicated cult following.

Plot
The series dealt with the life of Reg Toomer (Tim Healy), an Englishman from Shepherd's Bush living in Australia and running Melbourne Confidential, a failing private detective agency with his shifty business partner Dennis Tontine (Chris Haywood). His estranged young cousin Leslie (Mark Haddigan), also from Shepherd's Bush, hence one sense of the punning title, arrives in Melbourne from the UK after a painful divorce. He has  been promised fun and excitement in the new world, instead finds himself used as a drudge for Melbourne Confidential.

Each episode focused on a particular job undertaken by Melbourne Confidential, each one more elaborate and of more dubious legality than the last. Subplots involve Reg's lovelorn wife Doris (Pat Thomson), assertive daughter Arlene (Nadine Garner), Dennis' ex-wife Corrie (Kirsty Child) and kindly madam Delilah (Kris McQuade).

Produced by Verity Productions and Seven Network, the first series (only) was screened in Australia in late 1993.

The author
Douglas Livingstone (1934–2021) also wrote the screenplay for The Day of the Triffids (1981), the BBC adaptation of the John Wyndham novel, and wrote or co-wrote screenplays for several in the BBC 1985–1998 series Screen Two: Run for the Lifeboat, The Impossible Spy, and Return to Blood River.
He adapted several short stories ("Maigret Sets a Trap", "Maigret and the Night Club Dancer", and "Maigret and the Maid") by George Simenon for the 12-episode 1992 BBC series Maigret starring Michael Gambon.
He wrote the 1996 TV comedy Heavy Weather for the BBC and WGBH-TV, Boston, based on the P. G. Wodehouse novel.
He wrote the original six-episode drama series The Cazalets (2001) for BBC-TV, and three full-length comedies in the series The Quest (2002–2004) for Yorkshire Television.

References

External links

1991 British television series debuts
1992 British television series endings
1990s British drama television series
BBC television dramas
English-language television shows